The Myrtle Hill Plantation House is a historic plantation house located along Myrtle Hill Road, near Gloster, Louisiana in DeSoto Parish.

The original  house was built by two English brothers using the forced labor of enslaved people between 1835 and 1840. The present building was built in 1852 by Edward Riggs. The walls are framed with  rough-sawn or hand-hewn posts.

The house was listed on the National Register of Historic Places on December 4, 1974.

See also
National Register of Historic Places listings in DeSoto Parish, Louisiana

References

National Register of Historic Places in Louisiana
Greek Revival architecture in Louisiana
Buildings and structures completed in 1852
DeSoto Parish, Louisiana